Railfreight was a sector of British Rail responsible for all freight operations on the British network. The division was created in 1982 when BR sought to assign particular stock and management to the evolving requirements of freight traffic.

History
Railfreight existed as a single unit from 1982 until 1987 as the rail freight division of British Rail. In 1987 BRs freight operations were further divided according to the type of train operated and material carried; the Trainload Freight division and its sub-sectors handled unit trains of coal, metal, aggregates, oil or petroleum, LPG, petro-chemicals, and construction materials, Railfreight Distribution handled intermodal and non-unit train work, and channel tunnel freight. Activities which were not assigned to one of the new Trainload Freight or Railfreight Distribution sub-sectors were then continued under the Railfreight General banner, Railfreight General was dissolved in 1989, its limited responsibilities being taken over by Railfreight Distribution.

Brand
Railfreight's image had lagged behind the image of the other areas of British Rail, and staff morale reflected this. As part of major restructuring as traffic moved away from wagonload and towards unit trains and containerization, British Rail commissioned a major redesign of the brand from locomotive down to depot entry sign.
Roundel Design Group took inspiration from aircraft squadron markings, distinct and visible from a distance, which would also look well even when soiled.
To improve staff morale, over £8 million were invested in depot facilities, giving them a bright and fresh appearance, improving crew spaces, catching up on overdue maintenance. Unique plaques that represented major depots, were applied to locomotives and some rolling stock; with equipment easily identifiable as to its home depot, staff felt motivated to take more care in maintaining the locomotives assigned to them.
 
The rebranding extended beyond just rolling stock and locomotives; signage, depots, vehicles also received the new paint schemes and logos to tie the sectors together. The use of Rail Alphabet however remained consistent with the rest of British Rail.

Logos
In 1987, British Rail unveiled a new brand and image for Railfreight, introducing six logos for the six new sectors that Railfreight was divided into, Railfreight, Speedlink Distribution, Railfreight Petroleum, Railfreight Coal, Railfreight Construction, Railfreight Metals.
One of the more subtle aspects, was a 'vertical marker strip' used to tie publications, equipment and signage together, which duplicated the distinctive aspect of the main logo, such as 'triangles' for Speedlink Distribution and rectangles for General.

Livery

Railfreight grey
The Railfreight sector was immediately identifiable through the introduction of a new 'Railfreight Grey' livery, originally created for the new Class 58 locomotives which began to appear in 1982, and then soon applied to most of the locomotives and rolling stock assigned to the division. This new colour scheme was very distinctive on the British network as it represented the first clear break from the universal application of variations of Rail Blue for 15 years.

Railfreight red stripe
The new livery was further distinguished, in locomotive classes such as the Class 58 and Class 20  where the bodywork was mounted on a solebar, by painting the solebar red to give a distinctive red stripe running the length of the lower bodyside, a livery known as 'Railfreight Red Stripe'. Other classes of locomotives with an integrated monocoque construction and so no solebar, such as the Class 26, Class 31, Class 37, Class 47 and Class 56, also had red stripes applied to the lower body side.

Two-tone grey
Some of the monocoque locomotives briefly acquired a red stripe in 1987; however following the creation of Trainload Freight and Railfreight Distribution in 1987, they were soon repainted in the new sub-sector two-tone grey livery with appropriate decals.  Four remaining Railfreight locomotives and rolling stock, not assigned to the sub-sectors, were painted in two-tone grey livery with dedicated Railfreight General decals.
In 1992, Freight Connection 92 saw three Class 90s repainted into fictional interpretations of liveries from France, Germany and Belgium. Following the event, it was a suggestion of the personnel responsible for painting the locomotives that Railfreight Distribution adopt the French paint scheme. After some reworking, the design for the modified livery was finalised in March 1993; it revised the proportions of the grey sections and changed the roof colour slightly.  Most noticeable was the inclusion of "Railfreight Distribution" on the sides, the only sector to have its sector name displayed on locomotives.

Footnotes

References

1982 establishments in the United Kingdom
British Rail freight services
1987 disestablishments in the United Kingdom
British Rail subsidiaries and divisions